James Bradley Thayer (January 15, 1831 – February 14, 1902) was an American legal theorist and educator.

Life
Born at Haverhill, Massachusetts, he graduated from Harvard College in 1852, where he established the overcoat fund for needy undergraduates. In 1856 he graduated from Harvard Law School, was admitted to the bar of Suffolk County and began to practice law in Boston. From 1873 to 1883 he was Royall professor of law at Harvard. In 1883 he was transferred to the professorship which after 1893 was known as the Weld professorship and which he held until his death on February 14, 1902. He took a special interest in the historical evolution of law.

He wrote: The Origin and Scope of the American Doctrine of Constitutional Law (1893); Cases on Evidence (1892); Cases on Constitutional Law (1895); The Development of Trial by Jury (1896); A Preliminary Treatise on Evidence at the Common Law (1898), and a short life of John Marshall (1901); and edited the twelfth edition of Kent's Commentaries and the Letters of Chauncey Wright (1877), and A Westward Journey with Mr. Emerson (1884).

Rational basis review
The concept of rational basis review can be traced to his influential 1893 article, "The Origin and Scope of American Constitutional Law."  Thayer argued that statutes should be invalidated only if their unconstitutionality is "so clear that it is not open to rational question." Justice Oliver Wendell Holmes, Jr., a student of Thayer's, articulated a version of what would become rational basis review in his canonical dissent in Lochner v. New York, arguing that "the word 'liberty' in the 14th Amendment is perverted when it is held to prevent the natural outcome of a dominant opinion, unless it can be said that a rational and fair man necessarily would admit that the statute proposed would infringe fundamental principles as they have been understood by the traditions of our people and our law."

Works

Legal Essays BiblioBazaar, 2010, 
A Preliminary Treatise on Evidence at the Common Law, BiblioLife, 2015,

Notes

References

External links
 

1831 births
1902 deaths
People from Haverhill, Massachusetts
American legal scholars
Harvard Law School alumni
Massachusetts lawyers
Harvard Law School faculty
Harvard College alumni